Chris Tomlinson is an American journalist and author. He is a business columnist for the Houston Chronicle. Before working for the Chronicle, he worked for the Associated Press for 20 years. In 2021, he was awarded columnist of the year by the Texas Association of Managing Editors.

Books
with Bryan Burrough and Jason Stanford Forget the Alamo: The Rise and Fall of an American Myth
Tomlinson Hill: The Remarkable Story of Two Families Who Share the Tomlinson Name - One White, One Black

References

External links
Chris Tomlinson, Business Columnist - Houston Chronicle

American journalists
Year of birth missing (living people)
Living people
Place of birth missing (living people)